Gabriel Farias de Lima (born 27 October 1996 in Bonito), known as Gabriel Lima, is a Brazilian footballer who plays for Manaus FC, on loan from Tombense as a forward.

Honours
Avaí
Campeonato Catarinense: 2019

External links
Avaí profile 

1996 births
Living people
Brazilian footballers
Association football forwards
Campeonato Brasileiro Série A players
Campeonato Brasileiro Série B players
Campeonato Brasileiro Série C players
Clube do Remo players
Avaí FC players
Tombense Futebol Clube players
Esporte Clube São José players
Manaus Futebol Clube players